DEKA was a nationwide chain of general merchandise stores in New Zealand. It was launched in 1988 by L.D. Nathan, which split its supermarket and general merchandise divisions. In 1992 ownership of DEKA shifted to the Farmers Trading Company, which had until then been a competitor. As a result of unsustainable financial losses, all DEKA stores were either closed or converted to Farmers stores in 2001.

Trading history 

In 1985 L.D. Nathan split their business into two separate divisions; supermarkets and general merchandise after acquiring the McKenzies general merchandise stores. In 1988 L.D Nathan rebranded their General Merchandise business to DEKA, which launched with 90 stores. The launch was supported with a large advertising campaign of print and TV advertising with the "I Feel Good" slogan, using the James Brown I Got You song. DEKA used the "I Feel Good" slogan until 1996. 

DEKA joined with Farmers Trading Company in 1992 to create Farmers Deka Limited. 1996 saw the launch of DEKA's new slogan "You Know Where" which was later changed to "Better value, every day". By 2000 DEKA store numbers had reduced to 61 stores.

Closure 

On 30 July 2001, the DEKA brand ceased to operate in New Zealand. Its demise was due to fierce competition from The Warehouse and continual trading losses. Seventeen stores were converted to Farmers stores and the remaining 43 were closed.

The closure was announced in March 2001 by Farmers Deka Limited and its Australian parent company Foodland Associated Limited (FAL). They announced half-year losses of NZ$3.3m, which were accelerating, and redundancies for 468 full-time and 947 part-time employees. These job losses were partially offset by "almost 400" new roles within Farmers stores (including the 17 rebranded DEKAs).

In 2013, local residents of Huntly requested that a DEKA sign that had stood alone for more than a decade since the store's closure stay as a national icon.

Locations

Closed stores

 Northland - 4 (Kaitaia, Dargaville, Kaikohe, Whangarei)
 Auckland - 11 (Downtown (Queen St), Karangahape Rd, Manukau, Onehunga, Orewa, Otahuhu, Pakuranga, Papakura, Pukekohe, Takapuna, Glenfield, Henderson)
 Waikato - 5 (Cambridge, Hamilton, Morrinsville, Taupo, Te Awamutu, Tokoroa and, Huntly - the tall sign for the Huntly store still stands)
 Taranaki - 5 (Hāwera, New Plymouth, Stratford)
 King Country 2 - (Te Kuiti (now a Postie + store), Taumaranui)
 Bay of Plenty - 3 (Tauranga, Rotorua, Whakatane)
 Hawkes Bay - 3 (Dannevirke, Napier, Waipukurau, Wairoa)
 Manawatu - 3 (Palmerston North, Feilding, Whanganui)
 Wairarapa/Wellington - 8 (Coastlands (Paraparaumu), Cuba St (Wellington), Lambton Quay (Wellington), Levin, Lower Hutt (two stores), Upper Hutt to 1994, Masterton, Wainuiomata)
 Nelson/Marlborough - 3 (Blenheim, Richmond, Motueka)
 Canterbury - 6 (Ashburton, Bush Inn, Northlands Mall, New Brighton, Riccarton, Timaru)
 Otago - 4 (Balclutha, Dunedin x 2, Oamaru)
 Southland - 2 (Gore, Invercargill)
 Alofi, Niue Island

Rebranded as Farmers
 Auckland - 3 (New Lynn, Westgate (now closed), Whangaparaoa)
 Waikato - 3 (Chartwell (Hamilton),Morrinsville,Matamata, Tokoroa (Now closed))
 Bay of Plenty - 2 (Rotorua, Whakatane)
 Gisborne - 1 (Gisborne)
 Hawkes Bay - 1 (Hastings)
 Wellington - 2 (Kilbirnie, Upper Hutt)
 Nelson - 1 (Nelson)
 West Coast - 1 (Greymouth (Now closed))
 Canterbury - 3 (Hornby, Eastgate (Now Closed), Timaru)

See also
 Woolworths Supermarkets (New Zealand)

References

External links
 DEKA web page from Internet Archive
 Farmers Website

Department stores of New Zealand
Retail companies established in 1988
Retail companies disestablished in 2001
Defunct retail companies of New Zealand